The Western Australian Screen Academy (also known as WA Screen Academy) is situated within the School of Communications and Arts at Edith Cowan University in Perth, Western Australia.
The WA Screen Academy (WASA) offers one of Australia's advanced-level training programs in screen production. Operating in a partnership with the Western Australian Academy of Performing Arts (WAAPA).
The WA Screen Academy has a record of preparing graduates for employment in the industry. Graduates have become writers, production staff and crew on a number of Australian drama series and documentary productions, have secured feature film funding and more.
The program is delivered on the Mount Lawley campus of Edith Cowan University in Perth, Western Australia. 
The WA Screen Academy year runs over 40 teaching weeks from mid-February to the end of November, with a two-week mid-year break. This intensive year of study is equivalent to three university semesters or 1.5 years. Mid-year entry (late July) is available in special circumstances.

Achievements 
 2017: The doco On My Terms is selected for the St Kilda Film Festival.
 2017: Short film Dark Horses selected for St Kilda Film Festival, Beverly Hills Film Festival, Next Gen Short Film Festival, WA Unlocked Film Festival, London Independent Film Festival; winner of 5 awards.
 2011: Graduate Sam Barrett directs feature film Sororal
 2010: Graduate Sam Barrett directs feature film Esoterica
 2010: The doco Painful Bliss is selected for the Bondi Short Film Festival
 2010: Short film Stuffed wins ATOM Award for Best Tertiary Short Fiction
 2010: Ten films and docos selected for the Dungog Film Festival
 2010: Academy Director John Rapsey wins WA Screen Award for Outstanding Contribution to Industry
 2010: Graduate Mike Hoath wins WA Young Filmmaker of the Year
 2010: Graduate Magda Wozniak wins WA Screen Award for Best Screenplay
 2009: The short The Bucks' Party and the documentary The Bubbleologist selected for the Bondi Short Film Festival
 2008: Graduate Sam Barrett directs feature film No Through Road
 2008: Graduate Paul Komadina directs feature film Director's Cut
 2007: The short Postcard Vernosti receives Honours at California's ActionCut Festival
 2007: The short Postcard Vernosti receives Merit Award at Australian Shorts Festival

References

External links
 WA Screen Screen Academy, Western Australia

Edith Cowan University
Film schools in Australia